Paul Grey Mills Jr. is an American politician currently serving as a Republican member of the North Carolina House of Representatives representing the 95th district. Mills defeated incumbent Karen Ray in the 2008 primary, and served for 2 terms in the NC house from 2009 until 2013. In 2012, Mills sought the Republican nomination for Lieutenant Governor, but he lost to eventual winner Dan Forest. Following then incumbent Republican John Fraley's decision not to seek re-election to the state house in 2020, Mills sought election to his old seat and won.

Political positions
In May 2021, Mills voted for North Carolina House bill 453 which prohibited abortion based on race, sex, or suspected disability. In March 2021, he voted for House bill 134 which authorized possession of firearms on school grounds.

Electoral history

2020

2012

2010

2008

Committee assignments

2021-2022
Appropriations
Appropriations, Health and Human Services
Education - Universities
Election Law and Campaign Finance Reform - Chairman
Judiciary 1 - Vice Chairman
Redistricting
Rules, Calendar, and Operations of the House
Legislative Ethics Committee - Co-Chair
Legislative Research Commission

2011-2012
Appropriations - Central Government
Elections
Government
Insurance
Judiciary 
Transportation - Chair

2009-2010
Aging
Appropriations - Central Government
Commerce, Small Business, and Entrepreneurship
Education - Universities
Judiciary 3
Water Resources and Infrastructure

References

|-

Living people
Republican Party members of the North Carolina House of Representatives
Appalachian State University alumni
Regent University alumni
21st-century American politicians
People from Mooresville, North Carolina
Year of birth missing (living people)